Free Hand for a Tough Cop , also known as Tough Cop, is an Italian poliziottesco-action film directed in 1976 by Umberto Lenzi and the second entry into the Tanzi/Moretto/Monnezza shared universe. In this movie Tomas Milian plays for the first time Sergio Marazzi a.k.a. "Er Monnezza", a role that he later played several more times, in Lenzi's Brothers Till We Die (1978, a sort of sequel of this movie), in Destruction Force by Stelvio Massi (1977) and, with slight differences, in Uno contro l'altro, praticamente amici by Bruno Corbucci (1980) and in Francesco Massaro's Il lupo e l'agnello (1980).

Plot 
Camilla is a little girl suffering with a kidney disorder. Before she can receive her next due treatment she gets kidnapped. The gangsters intend to blackmail her rich father. Commissario Antonio Sarti knows that time is running out on the victim and takes desperate measures. He secretly organises a prison escape for petty crook Sergio Marazzi. By using Marazzi's insider knowledge of the criminal milieu Sarti detects kidnapper's hideout.

Cast 
 Tomas Milian as Sergio Marazzi a.k.a. "Er Monnezza"
 Claudio Cassinelli as Commissioner Antonio Sarti  
 Henry Silva as  Brescianelli
 Nicoletta Machiavelli as Mara
 Robert Hundar as  Mario “The Cynic”
 Biagio Pelligra as  Calabrese
 Giuseppe Castellano as  Vallelunga
 Ernesto Colli as Roscetto
 Tano Cimarosa as  Cravatta
 Dana Ghia as Clara Finzi
 Renato Mori as Commissioner Franchini
 Antonio Casale as Pasquale Tomati “Er Greve”
 Massimo Bonetti as  Pickpocket
 Luciano Rossi as Dealer
 Umberto Raho as Lawyer 
  Sara Franchetti as  Moretti's cleaning lady
 Arturo Dominici as De Rita  
 Giovanni Cianfriglia as Camini

See also    
 List of Italian films of 1976

References

External links

Free Hand for a Tough Cop at Variety Distribution

1976 films
Films directed by Umberto Lenzi
Poliziotteschi films
1970s crime action films
1970s Italian films